Jeetenge Hum is a 2001 Bollywood action film featuring Arshad Warsi, Arbaaz Khan and Anjala Zaveri in the leading roles.

References

External links
 

2001 films
2001 action films
Indian action films
2000s Hindi-language films